Javain Okemio Brown (born 9 March 1999) is a Jamaican professional footballer who plays as a right-back for Major League Soccer club Vancouver Whitecaps FC and the Jamaica national team.

Club career
Brown captained his high school team, Kingston College. He played club football for the Jamaican clubs Harbour View and Santos. In May 2018 he signed for US college team USF Bulls, and will begin play with them from 2019.

On 22 March 2019, it was announced that Brown would play for the Treasure Coast Tritons of USL League Two during the 2019 season.

On 21 January 2021, Brown was selected 23rd overall in the 2021 MLS SuperDraft by Vancouver Whitecaps FC. Brown signed with Vancouver on 17 February 2021.
He scored his first goal against Nashville SC on July 30th, 2022.

International career
He made his senior international debut for Jamaica in 2017.

In October 2018 he was selected by the Jamaican under-20 team for the 2018 CONCACAF U-20 Championship.

Honours

Club 
Vancouver Whitecaps
 Canadian Championship: 2022

References

External links 
 Javain Brown at USF Athletics

1999 births
Living people
Jamaican footballers
Jamaica under-20 international footballers
Jamaica international footballers
Harbour View F.C. players
Santos F.C. (Jamaica) players
South Florida Bulls men's soccer players
National Premier League players
Association football fullbacks
Jamaican expatriate footballers
Jamaican expatriate sportspeople in the United States
Expatriate soccer players in the United States
Treasure Coast Tritons players
USL League Two players
Vancouver Whitecaps FC draft picks
Vancouver Whitecaps FC players
Jamaican expatriate sportspeople in Canada
Expatriate soccer players in Canada
Major League Soccer players